The 1975 Chadian coup d'état was in considerable part generated by the growing distrust of the president of Chad, François Tombalbaye, for the army.  This distrust came in part from the Chadian Armed Forces (FAT) incapacity to deal with the rebellion that was inflaming the Muslim north from when the rebel insurgent group FROLINAT had been formed in 1966.

Arrests

Chad's former colonial power, France, had urged Tombalbaye to involve the military leadership in power, and the President did reserve a place in his party, the Chadian Progressive Party (PPT), for the army commander; but much more important and decisive in undermining his support among the military was, in 1973, to be the arrest of the Army Chief of Staff, General Félix Malloum, for an alleged coup plot (the so-called Black Sheep Plot).  Also the Generals Jacques Doumro and Negue Djogo, and other officers, were arrested between 1971 and 1975 on similar charges, the latter on March 23, 1975.

It was in this atmosphere of tension that Tombalbaye proceeded to yet another purge in the army, hitting this time the gendarmerie, the twelve hundred strong military police; its head, Colonel Djimet, and his aide, Major Kotiga, were both arrested on April 2, 1975, for the escape of some FROLINAT prisoners. This was to prove a fatal error.

Army mutiny

The coup started before sunrise on April 13 when in Boraho, a locality 35 miles (56 km) from the capital, army units led by Lieutenant Dimtolaum left their base and moved towards N'Djamena, where they converged on the president's white-walled palace on the edge of the city. At 5:00 a furious and bloody battle started with Tombalbaye's presidential guard, the Compagnies Tchadiennes de Securité (CTS).  Decisive in deciding the outcome of the battle was the arrival of the interim commander of the FAT, Noël Milarew Odingar, who brought reinforcements and assumed command of the insurgents.

Other sources name Colonel (later General) Kamougué as the leader of the coup.

At 8:30 Colonel Selebiani, head of the CTS, issued an appeal on the radio for his men to surrender; this put an end to all fighting. In the battle Tombalbaye had been fatally wounded, and died shortly after. When the news of Tombalbaye's death was given, there were mass celebrations in the capital, with thousands of Chadians pouring in the streets while dancing and joyfully chanting "Tombalbaye is dead".

Consequences

Already at 6:30 Odingar announced on the public radio that the armed forces had "exercised their responsibilities before God and the nation". In a later communique the coupists were to justify their actions, accusing Tombalbaye of having governed by dividing the tribes, and of having humiliated the army and treated it with contempt.

General Odingar acted provisionally as head of state and the jailed officers were immediately freed. Among these was General Félix Malloum, who was chosen to be chairman of a nine-man military junta, named the Supreme Military Council (Conseil Supérieur Militaire or CSM), that took office on April 15. It immediately arrested eight of Tombalbaye's top aides and suspended the 1962 constitution, while all parties were banned and the National Assembly was dissolved.

The success of the coup did not produce a major break with Tombalbaye's policies.  This was not surprising because, like Tombalbaye, both Odingar and Malloum were Sara from the south of Chad. While the CSM did make some moves to conciliate the north of the country, the Muslims continued to feel themselves second-class citizens and the FROLINAT rebellion continued.

References

External links

 "Conflict In Chad, 1975 To Present: A Central African Tragedy" (CSC 1984)
Country Studies - Tombalbaye Era, 1960-75
"Death of a Dictator", Time (April 28, 1975). Accessed on September 3, 2007.

See also
 2006 Chadian coup d'état attempt

Military coups in Chad
Conflicts in 1975
Chad
Political history of Chad
François Tombalbaye
1975 in Chad
Military history of Chad
April 1975 events in Africa